The Fort McMurray Oil Barons are a Junior A ice hockey team in the Alberta Junior Hockey League (AJHL). They play in Fort McMurray, Alberta, Canada at the Centerfire Place. The Oil Barons have won three AJHL playoff championships, three regular season titles, and one National Junior A Championship.

History
The team first played in the 1981–82 season as an expansion franchise the Alberta Junior Hockey League (AJHL) and is one of the more successful teams in the league having won three league titles and has appeared in the league finals 12 times. In 2000, the Oil Barons hosted the Royal Bank Cup and won the National Junior A Championship.

In November 2010, the Oil Barons hosted the Northern Classic against the Drayton Valley Thunder as the first known outdoor game in AJHL history and set the league's attendance record.

In August 2011, the Oil Barons traveled to Omsk, Russia, to play in the Junior Club World Cup tournament hosted by teams of their top tier Junior Hockey League (MHL).  On August 26, the Oil Barons defeated Mytishchi Atlantes 4–2 in an exhibition game.  On August 27, the Oil Barons played 2011 Russian Champion Red Army in another exhibition game, losing 7–0. The tournament ran from August 30 until September 4.  On August 30, Fort McMurray played Belarus's Dinamo-Shinnik and lost 3–0, on August 31 Sweden's Malmö Redhawks and lost 3–2, and September 2 they lost to the Czech Republic's Energie Karlovy Vary 4–1; for a 0–3 record and finishing last in their division.  These teams are all top tier European clubs, while Fort McMurray are members of the Canadian Junior Hockey League, the second highest level of Canadian junior hockey behind the major junior Canadian Hockey League.

In the summer of 2014, after one of the best regular seasons in franchise history, the Oil Barons released head coach and general manager Gord Thibodeau. After a lengthy search, the Barons hired former Ottawa Senators' assistant coach Curtis Hunt to replace him. Hunt added former Senators goalie Mike Brodeur to the staff as the team's new goaltending and video coach.

In 2015, the Oil Barons hosted the third Western Canada Cup, earning an automatic berth in the tournament against the champions of British Columbia, Alberta, Saskatchewan, and Manitoba, with two spots open to qualify for the Royal Bank Cup Junior A national championship tournament. They were eliminated in the semifinal game by the Melfort Mustangs at the 2015 Western Canada Cup.

On May 10, 2019, the Oil Barons agreed to mutually part ways with general manager and head coach Tom Keca. On May 17, 2019, the team announced that Dave Dupas had been hired as the head coach and general manager for the 2019–20 season. Dupas had been with the Oil Barons organization since 2015 as an assistant coach after previously serving as head coach of the Prince George Spruce Kings of the British Columbia Hockey League (BCHL).

Season-by-season record
Note: GP = Games played, W = Wins, L = Losses, T/OTL = Ties/Overtime losses, SOL = Shootout losses, Pts = Points, GF = Goals for, GA = Goals against

Western Canada Cup
The Western Canada Cup was a postseason tournament between the playoff champions of the Alberta Junior Hockey League (AJHL), British Columbia Hockey League (BCHL), Manitoba Junior Hockey League (MJHL), Saskatchewan Junior Hockey League (SJHL), and a previously selected host team from one of the leagues. It ran from 2013 to 2017 with the top two teams qualifying for the Royal Bank Cup Junior A national championship tournament. It replaced the Doyle Cup, which had been the qualifier for the AJHL and BCHL champions, and the ANAVET Cup, which had been the qualifier for the MJHL and SJHL champions. The qualifying system reverted the Doyle and ANAVET Cups in 2018.

The tournament began with round-robin play between the five team followed by the top two teams playing in championship game and the third and fourth place teams playing in a semifinal game. The loser of the championship game then faced the winner of the semifinal game for the runner-up qualifier. The winner of the championship and the runner-up game advanced to the Royal Bank Cup.

Junior A National Championship
The National Junior A Championship, formerly known as the Royal Bank Cup, is the postseason tournament for the Canadian national championship for Junior A hockey teams that are members of the Canadian Junior Hockey League. The tournament consists of the regional Junior A champions and a previously selected host team. Since 1990, the national championship has used a five-team tournament format when the regional qualifiers were designated as the ANAVET Cup (Western), Doyle Cup (Pacific), Dudley Hewitt Cup (Central), and Fred Page Cup (Eastern). From 2013 to 2017, the qualifiers were the Dudley Hewitt Cup (Central), Fred Page Cup (Eastern), and the Western Canada Cup champions and runners-up.

The tournament begins with round-robin play between the five teams followed by the top four teams playing a semifinal game, with the top seed facing the fourth seed and the second facing the third. The winners of the semifinals then face each other in final game for the national championship. In some years, the losers of the semifinal games face each other for a third place game.

NHL alumni
The following former Oil Barons have gone on to play in the NHL:

Dale Kushner
Bradley Mills
Rich Parent
Chris Phillips
Colton Parayko
Garret Stroshein
Scottie Upshall
Harry York

See also
 List of ice hockey teams in Alberta

References

External links
Fort McMurray Oil Barons website
Alberta Junior Hockey League website

Alberta Junior Hockey League teams
Fort McMurray
Ice hockey teams in Alberta
Ice hockey clubs established in 1981
1981 establishments in Alberta